The Formula-4s Powerboat World Championship is an international inshore powerboat racing competition for powerboats organised by the Union Internationale Motonautique (UIM), hence it often being referred to as F4s. “S” letter refers to abbreviation from four-stroke, which means that four-stroke boat engines are being used in this class.

History
This class was designed as an ecological alternative to UIMS750, UIMS550, UIM F4 and UIM F3 classes. Before getting World Championship status this class was called SL-60. First races were held in Scandinavia in 2005. In year 2009 this class was chosen as a base for ADAC Masters international series conducted in Germany. In year 2010 class was given current name F-4s and European Championship status. In year 2011 was launched promotional series F-4s conducted together with F1H2O events. In the year 2013 was organized first World Championship in Formula-4s class.

Evolution and international series

For the present moment class F-4s has most dynamic evolution in a powerboat races.
Stages of championships are conducted in various countries, such as Hungary, Latvia, Finland, France, Great Britain, Germany, Sweden, Italy.
Besides World and European Championships, prestigious international series are conducted such as ADAC Masters, Germany and promotional F-4s series to support F1H2O. In 2014 over 50 pilots participated in international series. And it is not able to count the number of national series pilots. Also a large number of open international events are conducted in different counties such as USA, China, United Arabian Emirates, Baltic and Scandinavian and many other countries.
It need to emphasize promotional F-4s series, which was funded to create a reserve of young pilots and give them opportunity to learn circuits of F1H2O. Races are conducted together with Royal Races at same weekend.
This popularity can be explained with several reasons.
One is a good safety. Boats of F-4s are equipped with safety cockpits taken from elder classes F1H2O and F2H2O. Currently, no fatalities or serious injuries among pilots of this class have been recorded. 
Also it need to emphasize affordable price of enter to this class and low costs comparing to other Formula classes – F1, F2, F500. However performance rates of assembling and tuning-up are close to elder classes. Several weeks of serious job needed to be done by highly skilled mechanics. Normally this kind of work is done by shipyards or racing clubs with proper equipment. Finally, one of the main reasons pilots participate it these races is because this class is a shortest way to Royal Races. F-4s one of few classes which gives right to apply for super-license after having some experience (eight races according to UIM rules). 
F-4s boats have same steering as an elder classes, corrected to speed. F-4s is a best practice for pilots. It was proven by tests of young pilots in F1 and F2 classes.

Boats

Boats in F-4s class is a tunnel catamaran. Construction technologies are same to elder classes. Newest technology and modern materials, such as carbon, kevlar, nomex, new types of polymer resin are used to construct boats. Costs of materials and manpower are high, same as in other Formula classes. That is because of high performance is need and high safety. Modern F-4s boats, like older classes, are equipped with 3000N/sm2 safety cockpits.

Many companies and private boat builders in Europe, USA, and China produce boats of this class. Leading companies are BABA Racing (Italy), ASV (Hungary), [https://web.archive.org/web/20141028075654/http://www.molgaard-racing.com/f4-gen-2/ Molgaard Racing (Denmark) and in the lead is Lönnberg (Finland)

Engines 

According to UIM rules, four-stroke Mercury 60 EFI Racing is being used as only possible engine for this class. With a modern trends, this engine has low emission and follows most strict ecological regulations. Same time this engine has a high-performance, because of low center of gravity given consequent to sport type of midsection and suspension.    

Engine data:
Power: 60Ps

Volume: 995 cm3

Number of cylinders: 4

Weight: 118 kg

The boats are fast, best catamaran class to start in. no need of tinkering with the engines, as in the SST-45 and 60 classes in the US, that uses technology from the 1970s.

Format

Stages of World and European championships is being conducted on circuits homologated by UIM. Number of boats in a heat should not exceed number of boats in homologation of race course. Participants of main heats are selected by qualification. Maximum straight is 600m. Races running anticlockwise. There are a minimum of two heats and generally there are three or four. Pilots are scored for each heat according to UIM rules. Winner is defined by sum of points.

Champions

World champions:

Formula 1 F4-s World Series:

	 	

European champions:

References

Formula 4S
Recurring sporting events established in 2008